The Australian Progressives is a minor Australian political party established in September 2014.

The party was registered as a federal political party by the Australian Electoral Commission on 17 February 2015. On 1 February 2018, the party was under threat of deregistration for failure to meet membership requirements. The party since contested the 2019 Australian federal election. However, the party was later deregistered at a federal level in March 2022 for failing to meet the increased 1500 minimum member requirement for party registration. This decision was overturned on 30 March when the AEC acknowledged they had made a mistake in their data-matching process. The party was once again deregistered on 12 October 2022.

History and structure
The Australian Progressives was established in September 2014, and registered in February 2015. Until August 2015, when the Australian Progressives merged with the unregistered Australian Progressive Party, the two similarly named parties were seen as competing for the same constituency.

The party contested the 2016 and 2019 Australian Federal Elections, as well as the 2017 Bennelong By-Election. Canberra Progressives, the ACT Branch of the Australian Progressives, were registered as an ACT political party in May 2020 and have contested the 2020 Australian Capital Territory general election.

The Australian Progressives has held five National Conferences since the party's founding, being 2015 in Sydney, 2018 in Melbourne, and 2019 in Canberra. The 2020 National Conference was scheduled to be held on the Gold Coast in June, but was rescheduled to an online event on 21 November due to the COVID-19 pandemic. In September 2021, amidst the 2021 Delta Outbreak the Party held another online conference. The 2022 National Conference was held on 30 July at the Gold Coast.

The Constitution of the Australian Progressives establishes the party's governance structure as involving a quasi-bicameral system, with an elected National Executive, chaired by a directly elected President of the Party, and an appointed National Operations Committee, chaired by the Party Secretary. The National Operations Team consists of the Directors of the Party, appointed functionaries who run the day-to-day operations of the party, including the Directors of Membership and Electorate Engagement, Communications, and Policy, as well as the Treasurer.

Electoral Legislation Amendment Bill 
In 2021 the Australian Progressives opposed the Electoral Legislation Amendment Bill proposed by the Morrison government. This would have tripled the required number of members for registration from 500 to 1500. The party estimated that 30 out of 44 minor parties could be deregistered as a result.

In a statement to The Guardian, President Therese Faulkner stated that:The major parties are behaving like a cartel by proposing limitations on voters ability to select the minor party that would best represent their interest.The bill passed in 2021 and the party reached 1500 members later that year.

National Executive 
The Party's National Executive consists of 8 General Executives, elected to a two-year term, the President of the Party, elected to a three-year term, and the Party Secretary and Treasurer who sit as non-voting observers. Half of the General Executive positions are up for election every year, creating a staggered electoral system. The Presidential Election occurs at the same time as every third General Executive Election.

Current National Executive

Policies
The Party has endorsed 3 fundamental objectives to guide their policy making agenda. These fundamental objectives are:

 The Australian Progressives seek the abolition of poverty in Australia.
 The Australian Progressives seek to end the Climate Emergency.
 The Australian Progressives seek to dismantle corruption in Australia.

Electoral results

2016 Federal election
In the 2016 Australian federal election, the Australian Progressives fielded two senate candidates in New South Wales, Queensland, South Australia and Victoria. It also stood a candidate for the northern Melbourne seat of Batman in the House of Representatives.

2017 Bennelong by-election
In the 2017 Bennelong by-election, Australian Progressives preselected Policy Director Christopher Golding, who was an employee of the NSW Department of Primary Industries, but resigned in order to be compliant with Section 44 of the Constitution.

2019 Federal Election
In the 2019 Australian federal election, the Australian Progressives contested 5 electorates, being all three ACT seats: Bean (Therese Faulkner), Canberra (Robert Knight), Fenner (Kagiso Ratlhagane), as well as Longman (Jono Young) in Queensland and Sturt (Angela Fulco) in South Australia.

2020 ACT election 
In the 2020 Australian Capital Territory general election, the Australia Progressives contested 3 of the 5 electorates taking 2.0% of the overall vote in the ACT: Kurrajong (Tim Bohm, 2.3%, Peta Bryant, 0.9%, and Therese Faulkner, 1.8%); Murrumbidgee (Robert Knight, 1.6% and Stephen Lin, 1.8%); and Yerrabi (Mike Stelzig, 0.6%, and Bethany Williams, 2.1%).

2022 Federal Election 
In the 2022 Australian federal election, the Australian progressives contested seats in both the Australian Senate, and the Australian House of Representatives. Janine Rees, candidate for Ryan, ran on a platform that included Women's Safety, and addresses domestic violence issues, including taking a Pledge for a Safer Future.

See also 
 Australian Progressive Alliance

References

2014 establishments in Australia
Political parties established in 2014
Republican parties in Australia